Parliamentary elections were held Cape Verde on 6 February 2011. The result was a victory for the ruling African Party for the Independence of Cape Verde (PAICV), led by Prime Minister Jose Maria Neves, which won 38 of the 72 seats in the National Assembly.

Results
Although technical problems prevented a prompt announcement of official results, it quickly became clear that PAICV had won a parliamentary majority, and Veiga conceded defeat on 7 February 2011. The opposition's immediate acceptance of defeat, prior to an official announcement, was viewed as a sign of the strength of democracy in Cape Verde.

By constituency

References

Elections in Cape Verde
Cape Verde
Parliamentary